Giovanni Gatto (died 1484) was a Roman Catholic prelate who served as Bishop of Catania (1475–1479) and Bishop of Cefalù (1472–1475 and 1479–1484).

Biography
On 1 Jun 1472, Giovanni Gatto was appointed during the papacy of Pope Sixtus IV as Bishop of Cefalù.
On 18 Aug 1475, he was appointed during the papacy of Pope Sixtus IV as Bishop of Catania.
On 8 Feb 1479, he was again appointed during the papacy of Pope Sixtus IV as Bishop of Cefalù.
He served as Bishop of Cefalù until his death in 1484.

References

External links and additional sources
 (for Chronology of Bishops) 
 (for Chronology of Bishops) 
 (for Chronology of Bishops) 
 (for Chronology of Bishops) 

15th-century Roman Catholic bishops in Sicily
Bishops appointed by Pope Sixtus IV
1484 deaths